Henrik Danielsen (born 23 January 1966) is a Danish-Icelandic chess grandmaster. He was Icelandic Chess Champion in 2009.

Chess career
Born in 1966, Danielsen earned his grandmaster title in 1996. In 1993, he finished joint first in the Politiken Cup with Igor Khenkin and John Emms on a score of 7½/10. He has played in six Chess Olympiads: three for Denmark (1992, 1994 and 1996); three for Iceland (2006, 2008 and 2012). He is the No. 4 ranked Icelandic player as of September 2020.

He regularly plays the Bird's Opening and has authored a book, entitled The Complete Polar Bear System (2016), on the opening.

References

External links

1966 births
Living people
Chess grandmasters
Chess Olympiad competitors
Danish chess players
Icelandic chess players
People from Guldborgsund Municipality